Veronica Namaganda Nanyondo (born on  22 July 1986 ) is a Ugandan politician  who represents Bukomansimbi District. She belongs to  National Unity Platform (NUP). Nanyondo began her political career in December 2015 under the Democratic Party(DP) ticket after being inspired by her sister Suzan Namaganda who died in road accident. Nanyondo is currently a woman MP for Bukomansimbi district who garnered 23,815 votes that made her a victor. She was interested in contesting for the position of Women MP because she wanted to build on what her late sister had started and thought that  she was the right person to replace her.

Education 
Nanyondo attained her Primary Leaving Examinations in 1998 at Kisojjo Primary School. She went ahead and attained  Uganda Certificate of Education in 2002 at Mende Kalema Memorial S.S. She did not stop their, she went ahead to attain the Uganda Advanced Certificate of  Education in 2004 at St. Andrew Kagwa S.S and lastly she attained the Bachelor of Arts in Education at Makerere University.

Work experience 
Nanyondo started  her job carrier in 2010 where she worked as she worked as a Sales and Marketing Executive in Unique Business Systems up to 2011. From  2011 to 2013 as a teacher at St. John S.S Mukono and she is currently working as a director in  Ver Stationaries Limited .  During the recent elections, She organized a joint rally with other NUP candidates where they received defectors from the ruling National Resistance Movement (NRM) party where they notified Police of their meeting and received clearance.

Family background 
Nanyondo is a sister in-law to Fred Mukasa Mbidde who is a representative in the East African Legislative Assembly(EALA) representative. Nanyondo is therefore a sister to the Late Suzan Namaganda who was Mukasa Mbidde's wife.

Hobbies 
 Following current affairs
 Research
 Praising God

Special interests 
 Helping the needy, orphans and widows
 Doing charity work
 Advocating for human rights

References 

Members of the Parliament of Uganda
1986 births
Makerere University alumni
People from Bukomansimbi District
Living people
21st-century Ugandan politicians
21st-century Ugandan women politicians